Bart Berman (born 29 December 1938) is a Dutch-Israeli pianist and composer, best known as an interpreter of Franz Schubert and 20th-century music.

Career 
Bart Berman studied piano with Jaap Spaanderman at a predecessor of the Conservatorium van Amsterdam and complemented his piano education with Theo Bruins and a master class by Alfred Brendel. In 1978 he moved to Israel.

As a soloist Berman was awarded the Dutch Prize of Excellence, the first prize in the Gaudeamus Competition for interpreters of contemporary music, the Friends of the Concertgebouw Award and four first prizes at competitions for young soloists. He has performed in Israel, Europe and the United States, as a soloist and in chamber music. Berman was a soloist with many Dutch and Israeli orchestras and has recorded for radio and television.

Collaborations included those with flautist Abbie de Quant (since 1970), Duo 4 with pianist Meir Wiesel, the Tamar Piano Trio with violinist Itzhak Segev and cellist Louis Rowen, as well as ensembles with several vocalists among whom Bat-Sheva Zeisler. Past partnerships include Duo Beer Sheva with the late pianist Sara Fuxon, Ensemble M, and Negev Baroque. During 2004-2008 Berman accompanied the remake of Hanoch Levin's satirical cabaret You, Me and the Next War, in 2007 he was the pianist and musical director of Schubert Plus, An Operatic Episode in Two Acts, and during 2011-2015 he was a guest soloist with the Zamir Quartet. In 2014 he launched a new program for 4 pianists at 2 pianos, based on Duo 4.

Berman taught piano at the conservatoires of Rotterdam and Arnhem and was an editor of the Israel Music Institute. Among his many students are Cleem Determeijer, Kees van Eersel, Margriet Ehlen, Dror Elimelech, Gerard Houtman, and Matthijs Verschoor.

Berman studied composition with Bertus van Lier and Wouter van den Berg. He has composed many original works, including cadenzas to all piano concerti by Haydn, Mozart and Beethoven and second piano parts to be played alongside original compositions by Muzio Clementi and Daniel Steibelt. Most noted are his completions to Schubert's unfinished piano sonatas and J.S. Bach's Art of Fugue.

Discography

Notable performances

Composition
 Farce of the Cow (1956), theater music for a 1612 play by Gerbrand Bredero
 Hans, the Bell Ringer (1956), theater music for a 1923 play by Johan Fabricius
 Duo in Mediterranean Style for violin and viola (1957)
 Christmas Song on a text by Bertus van Lier for choir a cappella (1957)
 Allegro for Orchestra (1958)
 Israeli Sonatina for piano (1958)
 String Quartet (1958)
 Four Melodies for piano (1960, revised 1980)
 Three New Canons on the Royal Theme of J.S. Bach: The Musical Offering (1978)
 Etude for the Fifths for piano (1992)
 Birthday Bunch for piano (1994)
 Film music for The Staircase for piano (1995)
 Variations and Fugue on a theme by Nikolai Medtner for piano (2009)
 Dayenu Fantasy for piano (2014)

Cadenzas
 Castiglioni: Arabeschi for flute, piano and orchestra (1974)
 The Beethoven piano concerti (1966–1990)
 The Mozart solo, double and triple piano concerti (1970–1990)
 The Haydn piano concerti (1970–1990)

Completions
 J.S. Bach: The Art of Fugue (1970)
 Schubert: Unfinished Piano Sonatas (1976–1990)
 Mozart: Sonata for Keyboard Four-hands in G major, K. 357 (1991)
 Glinka: Sonata in D minor for viola and piano (1999)
 Beethoven: Romance in E minor ("Romance Cantabile") for piano, flute, bassoon, and orchestra, Hess 13 (2001)

Piano parts
 Second Piano Part for Daniel Steibelt: Sonatina Opus 33 in C (1981)
 Right Hand Piano Part for J.S. Bach: Sonatas in E Minor and E Major (1988)
 Second Piano Part for Clementi: Six Sonatinas Opus 36 (1995)

References

External links
Bart Berman, pianist
Bart Berman, composition
Notes on Franz Schubert by Bart Berman

1938 births
Living people
20th-century classical composers
21st-century classical composers
Conservatorium van Amsterdam alumni
Dutch male classical composers
Dutch classical composers
Dutch classical pianists
Dutch emigrants to Israel
Jewish Dutch musicians
Israeli classical pianists
Israeli composers
Israeli Jews
Israeli music arrangers
Israeli people of Dutch-Jewish descent
Jewish classical composers
Jewish classical pianists
Musicians from Beersheba
Musicians from Eindhoven
Musicians from Rotterdam
People from Tel Aviv
People from Tel Mond
Recipients of the Gaudeamus International Interpreters Award
Musicians from Hendrik-Ido-Ambacht
Dutch music educators
Male classical pianists
21st-century classical pianists
20th-century Dutch male musicians
21st-century male musicians
Israeli harpsichordists
Dutch harpsichordists